USS LST-38 was a United States Navy  used exclusively in the Asiatic-Pacific Theater during World War II. Like many of her class, she was not named and is properly referred to by her hull designation.

Construction
LST-38 was laid down on 14 April 1943, at Pittsburgh, Pennsylvania by the Dravo Corporation; launched on 27 July 1943; sponsored by Bertha Karpinski; and commissioned on 3 September 1943.

Service history  
During World War II, LST-38 was assigned to the Asiatic-Pacific theater. She took part in the Occupation of Kwajalein and Majuro Atolls in January and February 1944; the Admiralty Islands landings in March and April 1944, the Battle of Hollandia in April 1944; and the Battle of Guam in July 1944.

Post-war decommissioning  
Following the war, LST-38 was redesignated LST(H)-38 on 15 September 1945. She performed occupation duty in the Far East until mid-November 1945.

Upon her return to the United States, the ship was decommissioned on 26 March 1946 and struck from the Navy list on 1 May 1946. On 5 December 1947, she was sold to the Ships and Power Equipment Co., of Barber, New Jersey, and subsequently scrapped.

Awards  
LST-38 earned four battle stars for World War II service.

See also 
 Landing craft
 List of United States Navy LSTs

References

Bibliography

External links

 

World War II amphibious warfare vessels of the United States
Ships built in Pittsburgh
1943 ships
LST-1-class tank landing ships of the United States Navy
Ships built by Dravo Corporation